The Mad is a 2007 comedy/horror film, starring Billy Zane and Maggie Castle, and directed and written by John Kalangis.

Plot
A doctor and his teenage daughter are terrorized by flesh-eating zombies at a truck stop.

Cast
 Billy Zane
 James Binkley
 Maggie Castle
 Matthew Deslippe
 Evan Charles Flock
 Jordan Madley
 Rothaford Gray
 Christopher Gross
 Shauna MacDonald

References

External links
 

2007 films
2007 comedy horror films
Canadian comedy horror films
Canadian zombie films
2000s English-language films
2000s Canadian films
English-language Canadian films